Dihedral or polyhedral may refer to:

 Dihedral angle, the angle between two mathematical planes
 Dihedral (aeronautics), the upward angle of a fixed-wing aircraft's wings where they meet at the fuselage, dihedral effect of an aircraft, longitudinal dihedral angle of a fixed-wing aircraft
 Dihedral group, the group of symmetries of the n-sided polygon in abstract algebra
 Also Dihedral symmetry in three dimensions
 Dihedral kite, also known as a bowed kite
 Dihedral doors, also known as  butterfly doors
 Dihedral prime, also known as a dihedral calculator prime
 In  rock climbing, an inside corner of rock

See also
 Anhedral (disambiguation)
 Euhedral, a crystal structure
 Polyhedron, a geometric shape